Franklin Bachelder Simmons (January 11, 1839 – December 8, 1913) was a prominent American sculptor of the nineteenth century. Three of his statues are in the National Statuary Hall Collection, three of his busts are in the United States Senate Vice Presidential Bust Collection, and his statue of Ulysses S. Grant is in the United States Capitol Rotunda.

Biography
Simmons was born in Webster, Maine.  He spent most of his childhood in Bath, Maine and Lewiston, Maine.  He attended Bates College (then called the Maine State Seminary) in 1858.  Simmons started sculpting and painting during childhood. He studied with John Adams Jackson.

During the last two years of the American Civil War, he moved to Washington, D.C. and modeled 24 portrait medallions of President Abraham Lincoln, his Cabinet, and generals and admirals. The Union League of Philadelphia purchased most of the medallions.  In 1867 Simmons received an honorary A.M. from Bates College and from Colby.

Simmons went to live in Rome in 1868, but returned several times. Among his portrait busts are those of David D. Porter, James G. Blaine, Francis Wayland, and Ulysses S. Grant (1886). He is said to have made a female statue of The Wanderer, meant to depict a Jewess wandering in the desert. He died in Rome, aged 74, and is buried in the Protestant Cemetery.

Selected works

 Bust of Oren Cheney (1861?), Bates College, Lewiston, Maine. Simmons sculpted this while a student at Bates College.
 Soldiers' Monument (1866–68), Kennedy Park, Lewiston, Maine.
 Soldiers and Sailors Monument (1867–69), Bellingham Square, Chelsea, Massachusetts.
 Penelope (marble, 1896), De Young Museum, San Francisco, California. Copies are at the Berkshire Museum in Pittsfield, Massachusetts; Lake Delaware Farm in Delhi, New York; the Detroit Institute of Arts; and the Portland Museum of Art in Portland, Maine.
 Jochebed with the Infant Moses (marble, 1873), Museum of Fine Arts, Boston, Massachusetts.
 The Promised Land (marble, 1874), Metropolitan Museum of Art, New York City.
 Roger Williams Monument (bronze, 1874–77), Roger Williams Park, Providence, Rhode Island. A bronze copy of his marble statue at the U.S. Capitol.
 Edward T. Little (bronze, 1875–77), Edward Little High School, Auburn, Maine.
 Bust of William B. Wood (marble, 1860), Lewiston Public Library, Lewiston, Maine
 Bust of Lyman Nichols (marble, 1860), Lewiston Public Library, Lewiston, Maine
 Bust of Admiral David Dixon Porter (marble, 1876), United States Naval Academy, Annapolis, Maryland.
 Miriam (year?)
 Medusa (1882)
 Galatea (1884)
 Senator Oliver P. Morton (bronze, 1884), Soldiers' and Sailors' Monument, Indianapolis, Indiana.
 The Seraph Abdiel (from "Paradise Lost") (1886). 
 Henry Wadsworth Longfellow (bronze, 1887), Longfellow Square, Portland, Maine.
 Soldiers' Monument (1888–91), Monument Square, Congress Street, Portland, Maine, Richard Morris Hunt, architect.
 Bust of Robert Treat Paine (marble, 1892), Museum of Fine Arts, Boston, Massachusetts.
 Equestrian Statue of Major General John A. Logan, cast in Rome by Alessandro Nelli (bronze, 1892–1901), Logan Circle, Washington, D.C., Richard Morris Hunt, architect.
 Alexander Hamilton (bronze, 1905–06), Great Falls of the Passaic Overlook Park, Paterson, New Jersey.
 Valley Forge (Seated Washington) (bronze, 1910), Washington Memorial Chapel, Valley Forge, Pennsylvania.

Union League of Philadelphia

  14 bronze portrait medallions of Civil War generals and politicians (1865).
President Abraham Lincoln
Secretary of the Treasury Salmon P. Chase
Secretary of State William H. Seward
Major General Nathaniel P. Banks
Major Gereral Ambrose Burnside
Major General Benjamin F. Butler
Major General Darius N. Couch
Major General Abner Doubleday
General of the Army Ulysses S. Grant
Major General Winfield S. Hancock
Major General Joseph Hooker
Major General Philip Kearny
Major General George Gordon Meade
Major General John Grubb Parke

United States Capitol

 Peace Monument (formerly Naval Monument) (marble, 1877), United States Capitol Grounds, Washington, D.C., Edward Clark, architect. The figures atop the monument are titled "Grief and History."
 Roger Williams (marble, 1872), National Statuary Hall Collection (representing Rhode Island). 
 Governor William King (marble, 1878), National Statuary Hall Collection (representing Maine).
 Bust of Vice President Hannibal Hamlin (marble, 1889), United States Senate Vice Presidential Bust Collection.
 Bust of Vice President Adlai E. Stevenson (marble, 1894), United States Senate Vice Presidential Bust Collection.
 Ulysses S. Grant (marble, 1899), United States Capitol Rotunda. Simmons's original 1894 statue was rejected for the U.S. Capitol. It is now in the Portland Museum of Art.
 Bust of Vice President Charles W. Fairbanks (marble, 1905), United States Senate Vice Presidential Bust Collection.
 Francis Harrison Pierpont (marble, 1910), National Statuary Hall Collection (representing West Virginia).

Gallery

References

External links

 Art Cyclopedia List of Famous Works
 Universal Cyclopædia & Atlas, 1902 ed., New York, D. Appleton & Co.
 

1839 births
1913 deaths
Bates College alumni
People from Androscoggin County, Maine
People from Bath, Maine
People from Lewiston, Maine
American expatriates in Italy
Burials in the Protestant Cemetery, Rome
Artists from Maine
20th-century American sculptors
20th-century American male artists
19th-century American sculptors
19th-century American male artists
American male sculptors